Konstantin Vishnyakov (born March 6, 1982) is a Russian sprint canoer who has competed since the late 2000s. He won two bronze medals in the K-4 200 m event at the ICF Canoe Sprint World Championships, earning them in 2006 and 2007.

Vishnyakov also finished eighth in the K-4 1000 m event at the 2008 Summer Olympics in Beijing. The last showing in a World Championship was in 2011, where he placed seventh in the Men's K-2 500m kayak double.

References

Sports-reference.com profile

1982 births
Canoeists at the 2008 Summer Olympics
Living people
Russian male canoeists
Olympic canoeists of Russia
ICF Canoe Sprint World Championships medalists in kayak